Tallamudi is a village in West Godavari district of the Indian state of Andhra Pradesh. It is located in Pedapadu mandal.

Demographics 

 Census of India, Vatluru had a population of 14,368. The total population constitute, 3305 males and 3775 females —a sex ratio of 1143 females per 1000 males. 1,077 children are in the age group of 0–6 years with sex ratio of 944. The average literacy rate stands at 81.73% .

References 

Villages in West Godavari district